Bob Ripa (1913–1943) was an American entertainer killed in a plane crash in 1943 while on a USO tour.

He was a leading juggler of the time.

References

1913 births
1943 deaths
Jugglers
Victims of aviation accidents or incidents in 1943